is a Japanese actress and former singer. She is a former member of Super Girls. Asakawa is represented with Avex Vanguard.

Awards

Works

Participation music

Filmography

Films

TV dramas

Other TV programmes

Internet

Radio

Advertisements

Stage

Image character

Bibliography

Photo albums

Newspaper columns

References

External links
Official profile – Avex Vanguard 
 – Ameba Blog 

21st-century Japanese actresses
Japanese gravure idols
Avex Group talents
Musicians from Saitama Prefecture
1999 births
Living people